4Ever Blue is the second compilation album by British boyband Blue.

Background
Following the release of Best of Blue, band members Simon Webbe and Antony Costa made the decision to release an album compiling a selection of the group's b-sides, remixes and previously unreleased material. The album also includes three tracks only previously in Japan: "The Gift", "It's Alright" and "Elements". The album also includes band member Duncan James' debut solo single, "I Believe My Heart". By the indication of the album booklet, a live version of "Lonely This Christmas" from CD:UK was intended to be track seven on the album, however, was removed from the track listing for unknown reasons. The album was released in July 2005, becoming available in several European countries, as well as Japan, Thailand and China, however, charting only in Japan at #83. The album was not released in the UK, despite copies being widely available.

Track listing

Certifications

References

Blue (English band) compilation albums
2005 compilation albums
Virgin Records compilation albums